Jiří Kittner (born 5 January 1963 in Liberec) is a Czech politician who has served as mayor of Liberec since 2000.

A native of Liberec, Kittner earned his degrees in automotive and electronic technology. In 1982, he became chair of the economic school in Prague. By 1991, he ran a commercial bank, then joined an economic firm in 1994. Kittner joined the local community government in Liberec in 1998 before brin elected the city's mayor in 2009.

Kittner has been a major sponsor of the 2009 Nordic skiing world championships in his hometown, which was awarded to his city by the International Ski Federation in 2004.

References
 Liberecko.net profile 
 Official website 

1963 births
Living people
Politicians from Liberec
Mayors of places in the Czech Republic
Civic Democratic Party (Czech Republic) mayors